Bill Gilmour Jr. (born 29 May 1960) is an Australian former professional tennis player.

Gilmour won a boys' doubles tile at the 1978 Australian Open (with Michael Fancutt). His father, Bill Sr, was also an Australian Open junior champion and played on the international tour, later becoming a Davis Cup referee.

While competing on the professional circuit, Gilmour had a best singles world ranking of 454 and made qualifying draw appearances at Wimbledon. He now coaches at his family's tennis centre in Sydney.

References

External links
 
 

1960 births
Living people
Australian male tennis players
Australian Open (tennis) junior champions
Grand Slam (tennis) champions in boys' doubles
20th-century Australian people